Palliyodam is a type of large snake boat built and used by Aranmula Parthasarathy Temple  in the Pathanamthitta district for the annual water processions of Uthrattathi Jalamela and Valla Sadhya in Pamba River.

Legend

According to the legend, these snake boats were designed by Lord Krishna and were made to look like Sheshanaga, the serpent on which Lord Vishnu rests on.

Composition

Palliyodam is made from anjili (a kind of jackfruit tree).  There will be 64 rowers in  Palliyodam each representing 64 art forms. And the 4 rowers at the end represent the four Vedas. There are 9 golden shapes at the ends of the Palliyodam which  represent the 9 planets(Navagraha). The Palliyodam is kept inside special sheds called Palliyoda Pura, into which outsiders are not allowed to enter.

Rules
Only males are allowed to enter the Palliyodam and they are allowed only after they followed a prescribed diet and ritual, and also they can't enter inside wearing any other clothing,except the  Mundu and a thorthu (a white towel).

See also
Aranmula kottaram

References

Indigenous boats